The Berenstain Bears Comic Valentine is a Valentine-themed animated television special based on the Berenstain Bears children's book series by Stan and Jan Berenstain. Produced by Buzz Potamkin and directed by Mordicai Gerstein and Al Kouzel, the program made its debut on NBC on February 13, 1982.

Development
Stan and Jan Berenstain's first animated holiday special aired on NBC in December 1979. The Berenstain Bears' Christmas Tree was the first of five annual animated specials that would air on NBC, produced by Joe Cates and the Joseph Cates Production Company. The Berenstain Bears Meet Bigpaw was the second in this series, followed by the third special The Berenstain Bears' Easter Surprise.

The Berenstains utilized rhyming couplets in the script - for both the narrator and the character dialogue. This element had also been used in the Christmas special and was familiar to audiences since a similar type of writing was used in the Berenstain Bears Beginner Books series.

Cast
 Ron McLarty as Papa Bear
 Pat Lysinger as Mama Bear
 Knowl Johnson as Brother Bear
 Gabriela Glatzer as Sister Bear, Charlene, Honey Bear, Cheerleaders
 Jerry Sroka as Bearcaster

Production and casting
The 25-minute special was created and written by Stan and Jan Berenstain and featured original music composed and conducted by Emmy-winning musician Elliot Lawrence, with lyrics provided by Stan Berenstain. The score included three original songs.

It was the fourth of five Berenstain Bears animated specials that aired on NBC from 1979 to 1983.

Premiere
The program premiered on NBC on February 13, 1982.

Plot

Book adaptation

Home media releases
In 1984, Embassy Home Entertainment released the special on LaserDisc as a double-feature with The Berenstain Bears' Christmas Tree, called A Berenstain Bears Celebration. In 1987, the special was made available on VHS by Embassy Home Entertainment as part of their "Children's Treasures" series. In 1989, the special was distributed on VHS by Kids Klassics. The special was re-released in 1992 by GoodTimes Home Video, in a double-feature with The Berenstain Bears' Christmas Tree. In 2002, the special was released on DVD by GoodTimes, also in a double-feature with The Berenstain Bears' Christmas Tree. In 2008, Sony Wonder also released the special on DVD. In this edition, it was bundled with a few bonus episodes from the 1980s cartoon series.

References

External links
 
 "Who is Bigpaw" by Mike Berenstain
 Berenstain Bears Official Website
 Berensatin Bears Meet Bigpaw full video

Valentine's Day television specials
1980s animated television specials
NBC television specials
1980 in American television
1980 television specials
1980s American animated films
Animated television specials
1980s American television specials
Berenstain Bears
American television shows based on children's books
NBC network original films
1982 films